Marzanak (also Romanized as Marzānak; also known as Marūnok, Marzoonak, and Marzūnak) is a village in Kezab Rural District, Khezrabad District, Saduq County, Yazd Province, Iran. At the 2006 census, its population was 81, in 27 families.

References 

Populated places in Saduq County